Visa requirements for European Union citizens are administrative entry restrictions by the authorities of other countries placed on citizens of the European Union. They differ among countries. The European Union has achieved full reciprocity with certain countries.

Current member states of the European Union are Austria, Belgium, Bulgaria, Croatia, Cyprus, Czech Republic, Denmark, Estonia, Finland, France, Germany, Greece, Hungary, Ireland, Italy, Latvia, Lithuania, Luxembourg, Malta, Netherlands, Poland, Portugal, Romania, Slovakia, Slovenia, Spain and Sweden.

Member states' citizens enjoy freedom of movement in each other's territories. European Union citizens and European Free Trade Association (EFTA) nationals are not only visa-exempt but are legally entitled to enter and reside in each other's countries. The United Kingdom and the EU continued to maintain the same mutual policy until 31 December 2020.

The freedom of movement provisions do not apply to the overseas countries and territories (except Saint Barthélemy) and the Faroe Islands.

Visa requirements map

Visa free access
This table lists all countries, with source information as it is cited inline, for which citizens of at least one EU member state may enter without a visa on an ordinary passport. Information regarding visas on arrival and on exit fees is not listed in the table, regarding which, see the relevant section below.

All European Union citizens can visit the following partially recognised countries or territories with autonomous immigration policies without a visa — in Europe: Kosovo, Transnistria, in Asia: Hong Kong, Macau, Palestine, Turkish Republic of Northern Cyprus, South Ossetia, Taiwan.

All European Union citizens always must arrange the visa prior to travel to (as of October 2019) Afghanistan, Algeria, Angola, Azerbaijan, Bhutan, Cameroon, Central African Republic, Chad, China (except short term visits in transit and Hainan), Republic of the Congo, Democratic Republic of the Congo, Côte d'Ivoire, Cuba (can be obtained in travel agencies or airlines), Djibouti, Equatorial Guinea, Eritrea, Ghana, Guinea, India, Iraq (outside Iraqi Kurdistan), North Korea, Liberia, Libya, Mali, Nauru, Niger, Nigeria, Oman, Russia, South Sudan, Sudan, Suriname, Syria, Turkmenistan and Yemen.

Reciprocity

As per Regulation No 539/2001 (amended by Regulation No 1289/2013) reciprocity is required from all Annex II countries and territories. That means that these countries must offer visa-free access for 90 days to all EU citizens (except citizens of Ireland) and to the citizens of Iceland, Liechtenstein, Norway and Switzerland. When this is not the case, the affected EU or Schengen member state is expected to notify the European Commission. Starting six months after the notification, the Commission may adopt an implementing act to suspend the visa-free regime for certain categories of nationals of the third country concerned, for a period of up to six months, with a possible prolongation by further periods of up to six months. If the Commission decides not to adopt such an act, it has to present a report explaining the reasons why it did not propose the measure. If after two years from the notification the third country is still requiring visas from citizens of one or more Member States, the Commission shall adopt a delegated act to re-impose the visa obligation on all citizens of the third country, for a period of 12 months. Either the European Parliament or the Council could oppose the entry into force of the delegated acts. All of the states that implement the common visa rules – including Iceland, Liechtenstein, Norway, Switzerland, Bulgaria, Croatia, Cyprus and Romania – may notify the European Commission about non-compliant third states.

The EU has achieved full reciprocity with the following countries (meaning the citizens of those countries may travel to all EU member states visa-free) — Antigua and Barbuda, Argentina, Australia, Bahamas, Barbados, Brazil, Brunei, Canada, Chile, Costa Rica, Dominica, El Salvador, Grenada, Guatemala, Honduras, Kiribati, Malaysia, Mexico, New Zealand, Nicaragua, Panama, Paraguay, Saint Kitts and Nevis, Saint Lucia, Saint Vincent and the Grenadines, Samoa, Singapore, Solomon Islands, South Korea, Tonga, Trinidad and Tobago, Tuvalu, United Kingdom, Uruguay, Vanuatu.

Following countries are not implementing visa reciprocity fully:

 Japan: For Romanian citizens a temporary waiver is in effect until 31 December 2018. The new policy also allows holders of temporary or provisional passports to travel to Japan without a visa.
 United States: As of September 2021, Bulgarian, Cypriot and Romanian citizens are still required to apply for a visa to enter the US. Nonetheless, the US refuses to lift the requirements. On 3 March 2017, the European Parliament voted in favor to impose visa requirements on U.S. citizens in the future.

According to a report from April 2015, the Commission dismissed notifications by both Bulgaria and Romania of a general visa requirement by Australia. It concluded that the Australian electronic visa 'manual processing' treatment should not be considered as equivalent to the Schengen visa application procedures and consequently will not be covered by the reciprocity mechanism. In its previous report the Commission also committed to assessing certain provisions of the US ESTA system — such as the application fee — and the Australian eVisitor system.

In October 2014, it was reported that the Comprehensive Economic and Trade Agreement with Canada might not be ratified by Bulgaria and Romania unless visa requirements were lifted for their citizens. In November 2014 Bulgarian Government also announced that it will not ratify the Transatlantic Trade and Investment Partnership unless the United States lifted visas for its citizens.

Special requirements
The following countries require electronic registrations for all citizens of the European Union who don't need a visa:
 Australia requires EU citizens to obtain an eVisitor, which is issued free of charge.
 Canada requires EU citizens to obtain an eTA if arriving by air. The application fee is 7 CAD.
 New Zealand requires EU citizens to obtain an NZeTA and IVL if arriving by air. The application fee is NZD 9 or 12 and NZD 35.
 United States requires eligible EU citizens to obtain an ESTA for arrivals by air and sea. The application fee is US$21.

Visa on arrival
The following countries provide visa on arrival to the citizens of the European Union. Some of these countries may be available for visa free access to some (*) or all other EU nationals (**) – for details see above. Some countries may not provide visa on arrival facilities at all entry points.

Limited visa on arrival

 - Visas are issued on arrival if an Entry Authorisation letter was issued by the authorities of Burundi.
 – Holders of ordinary passports of all EU member states may obtain a visa on arrival for Iraqi Kurdistan valid for 15 days when arriving through the Erbil International Airport or Sulaimaniyah International Airport.
 - All EU nationals may obtain visa on arrival when travelling on business. They must have a local sponsor who must obtain an approval from the immigration authorities at the port of arrival (Islamabad, Lahore, Peshawar, Quetta or Karachi airports) and a recommendation letter from country of residence or invitation letter from Pakistan. Nationals of Austria, Belgium, Denmark, Finland, France, Germany, Greece, Italy, Luxembourg, Netherlands, Portugal, Spain, Sweden and the United Kingdom may obtain a visa on arrival for a maximum stay of 30 days, if they are travelling as part of a group through a designated tour operator.
 - Visitors can obtain a visa on arrival for a maximum stay of 1 or 3 months if they are holders of an approval letter issued and stamped by the Vietnamese Immigration Department (obtainable online through travel agencies for a fee) and if arriving only at airports in Hanoi, Ho Chi Minh City or Da Nang. All travellers can visit Phú Quốc without a visa for up to 30 days.

Online visas
The following countries provide electronic visas to the citizens of the European Union.

Other
 – As of 2013 all EU citizens transiting through People's Republic of China at one of the following airports may leave the terminal and visit the city for up to 72 hours – Beijing, Chengdu, Chongqing, Guangzhou, Guilin, Shanghai, Dalian, Shenyang, Xi'an. Visa-free access to Hainan Island as long as the visit lasts 15 days or less and is part of a tour group organised by a National Tourism Administration of China-approved travel agency based in Hainan is granted to the following EU nationals - Austria, Denmark, France, Finland, Germany, Italy, Netherlands, Spain and Sweden .
 /  - a universal KAZA visa that is valid for both countries can be issued on arrival to citizens of Austria, Belgium, Czech Republic, Denmark, Finland, France, Germany, Greece, Hungary, Italy, Luxembourg, Netherlands, Poland, Portugal, Slovakia, Slovenia, Spain and Sweden.
 /  /  - an East Africa Borderless Visa: Travelers from any country can obtain a multiple entry visa that allows entry to these three countries for tourism over period of 90 days. Visa must be first used in the country that issued it.

Non-ordinary passports
In addition to visa requirements for normal passport holders certain countries have specific visa requirements towards diplomatic and various official passport holders:

Cape Verde, Ethiopia, Mali and Zimbabwe grant visa-free access to holders of diplomatic or service passports issued to nationals of any country. Mauritania and Senegal grant visa-free access to holders of diplomatic passports issued to nationals of any country (except Italy for Mauritania). Bahrain, Bangladesh, Burkina Faso, Cambodia and South Sudan allow holders of diplomatic, official, service and special passports issued to nationals of any country to obtain a visa on arrival.

Non-visa restrictions

Passport rankings
Passport rankings by the number of countries and territories their holders could visit without a visa or by obtaining visa on arrival in January 2022 according to the Henley Passport Index were as follows (ranked):  German — 190 countries and territories (2nd); Finnish,  Italian, Luxembourgish, Spanish,  — 189 (3rd); French,  Swedish — 186 (4th); Austrian, Dutch, Portuguese — 185 (5th); Belgian, Greek, Irish — 184 (6th); Czech, Maltese — 183 (7th); Lithuanian, Slovak — 181 (9th); Hungarian, Latvian, Slovenian — 180 (10th); Estonian — 179 (11th); Polish — 174 (13th); Cypriot — 173 (14th); Romanian — 171 (16th); Bulgarian — 170 (17th); Croatian — 168 (18th). All EU passports are ranked within the top 20 positions. Passports of the European Free Trade Association countries rank similarly, Norwegian, Swiss — 184 (6th); Icelandic — 180 (10th) and Liechtenstein — 177 (12th), while the passports of the candidate states rank lower Serbian — 131 (39th); North Macedonian — 123 (45th); Montenegrin — 122 (46th); Albanian — 113 (51st) and Turkish — 112 (52nd). European microstates rank high: Monaco — 173 (14th); San Marino — 167 (19th); Andorra — 166 (20th) and Vatican City — 148 (29th).

Future
European Commission proposed a visa-free travel for 16 island nations in 2012. This proposal foresees that the visa exemption will be reciprocated through visa waiver agreements, ensuring a visa free regime for all EU citizens who wish to travel to these countries. The island nations in question are Caribbean island nations – Dominica, Grenada, Saint Lucia, Saint Vincent and the Grenadines and Trinidad and Tobago, and Pacific island nations – Kiribati, the Marshall Islands, Micronesia, Nauru, Palau, Samoa, the Solomon Islands, Timor-Leste, Tonga, Tuvalu and Vanuatu. The list was expanded in 2013 with Colombia, Peru and the United Arab Emirates. Most of these countries already provide visa-free or visa on arrival access in some form to the EU citizens. As of 2020, visa-free agreements have been concluded with all listed nations except Nauru.

Freedom of movement within the EEA and Switzerland

Directive 2004/38/EC of the European Parliament and of the Council of 29 April 2004 recognises the right of citizens of the Union and their family members to move and reside freely within the territory of the Member States
defines the right of free movement for citizens of the European Economic Area (EEA), which includes the European Union (EU) and the three European Free Trade Association (EFTA) members Iceland, Norway and Liechtenstein. Switzerland, which is a member of EFTA but not of the EEA, is not bound by the Directive but rather has a separate bilateral agreement on the free movement with the EU.

Citizens of all European Economic Area (EEA) member states and Switzerland holding a valid passport or national identity card enjoy freedom of movement rights in each other's territory and can enter and reside in the each other's territory without a visa.

If EU, EEA and Swiss nationals are unable to present a valid passport or national identity card at the border, they must nonetheless be afforded every reasonable opportunity to obtain the necessary documents or have them brought to them within a reasonable period of time or corroborate or prove by other means that he/she is covered by the right of free movement.

However, EU, EEA member states and Switzerland can refuse entry to an EU/EEA/Swiss national on public policy, public security or public health grounds where the person presents a "genuine, present and sufficiently serious threat affecting one of the fundamental interests of society". If the person has obtained permanent residence in the country where he/she seeks entry (a status which is normally attained after 5 years of residence), the member state can only expel him/her on serious grounds of public policy or public security. Where the person has resided for 10 years or is a minor, the member state can only expel him/her on imperative grounds of public security (and, in the case of minors, if expulsion is necessary in the best interests of the child, as provided for in the Convention on the Rights of the Child). Expulsion on public health grounds must relate to diseases with 'epidemic potential' which have occurred less than 3 months from the person's the date of arrival in the Member State where he/she seeks entry.

A family member of an EU/EEA/Swiss citizen who is in possession of a residence permit indicating their status is exempt from the requirement to hold a visa when entering the European Union, European Economic Area or Switzerland when they are accompanying their EU/EEA/Swiss family member or are seeking to join them.

Right to consular protection 
When in a non-EU country, EU citizens whose country maintains no embassy there have the right to get consular protection from the embassy of any other EU country present there.

As of 2014, there are 16 non-EU countries where there is only one embassy of an EU country:  Barbados (EU delegation), Belize (EU office), Central African Republic (France, EU delegation), Comoros (France), Gambia (EU office), Guyana (EU delegation), San Marino (Italy), São Tomé and Príncipe (Portugal), Timor-Leste (Portugal, EU delegation), and Vanuatu (France, EU delegation).

As of 2014,  the following 18 non-EU countries have no embassy of an EU country: Bahamas, Bhutan (Denmark Liaison office), Dominica, Grenada, Kiribati, Lesotho (EU delegation), Liechtenstein, Maldives, Marshall Islands, Micronesia, Nauru, Palau, Saint Kitts and Nevis, Saint Vincent and the Grenadines, Samoa (EU office), Swaziland (EU office), Tonga, and Tuvalu.

See also

Passports of the European Union
Visa policy of the Schengen Area
Visa policy of Ireland
Visa requirements for Estonian non-citizens
Visa requirements for Latvian non-citizens

References

External links
Timatic service giving subscribers up-to-date information on visa requirements 

European Union
Foreign relations of the European Union